Søre Herefoss is a village in Birkenes municipality in Agder county, Norway. The village is located on the southeastern shore of the lake Herefossfjorden, at the junction of the Norwegian National Road 41 and the Norwegian County Road 404.

References

Villages in Agder
Birkenes